Clematis potaninii, the old man's beard, is a species of flowering plant in the family Ranunculaceae, native to Tibet and central China. Its cultivar 'Summer Snow', also known as 'Paul Farges', has gained the Royal Horticultural Society's Award of Garden Merit.

References

potaninii
Garden plants of Asia
Endemic flora of China
Flora of Tibet
Flora of South-Central China
Flora of Southeast China
Plants described in 1890